Red Gelao language may refer to two different Gelao languages:
A'ou language, spoken in Guizhou Province, China
Vandu language, spoken in Ha Giang Province, Vietnam